Eure-Roberts House is a historic home located at Gatesville, Gates County, North Carolina.  It was built about 1850, and is a large two-story, side-gable frame dwelling. It was remodeled about 1901 to add a Queen Anne wraparound porch.  Also on the property is a one-story, side-gable heavy braced-frame smokehouse built about 1850.

It was listed on the National Register of Historic Places in 2006.

References

Houses on the National Register of Historic Places in North Carolina
Queen Anne architecture in North Carolina
Houses completed in 1850
Houses in Gates County, North Carolina
National Register of Historic Places in Gates County, North Carolina